With Love is a studio album by French singer Amanda Lear, released in 2006 by Dance Street. The album is a collection of covers of songs previously performed by other female vocalists.

Background 
The album was recorded at Blue Sound Studio in Levallois-Perret and LR Studio in Villeneuve between May and August 2006. It contains covers of evergreens and jazz standards by the disco diva's own favourite divas, among them Eartha Kitt, Dalida, Peggy Lee, Mae West, Nina Simone, Marlene Dietrich and Juliette Gréco. The album came five years after the album Heart, on which Lear covered three evergreens: "Hier Encore", "The Look of Love" and "Lili Marleen", and only a year after her covers compilation Sings Evergreens. Lear had also released an all-cover EP in 1985, A L.

The album was released by ZYX Music in Germany in 2007 with a bonus live recording of the track "Johnny", and in 2008 in Italy under the title Amour toujours (French for Love Forever) with two re-recordings of Lear's Seventies hits "Queen of Chinatown" and "Tomorrow" as bonus tracks. The album was re-reissued by ZYX Music again in November 2008, then as a mid-price release under the title My Baby Just Cares for Me, with a different artwork and without any of the bonus tracks. The digital version of the album includes both the live version of "Johnny" and new versions of "Queen of Chinatown" and "Tomorrow".

No singles were released from the album, however, a promotional music video was produced, depicting Lear performing excerpts of various songs from the album in the studio, directed by Denis Larrieste.

Track listing

Original release 
 "C'est Magnifique" (Cole Porter) – 2:29
 "Whatever Lola Wants" (Richard Adler, Jerry Ross) – 3:07
 "Is That All There Is?" (Jerry Leiber, Mike Stoller) – 4:24
 "Love for Sale" (Cole Porter) – 3:36
 "I'm in the Mood for Love" (Dorothy Fields, Jimmy McHugh) – 3:48
 "My Baby Just Cares for Me" (Walter Donaldson, Gus Kahn) – 3:37
 "Si la photo est bonne" (Barbara) – 2:53
 "Johnny" (Friedrich Hollaender) – 3:04
 "Bambino" (Giuseppe Fanciulli, Nisa) – 3:20
 "Senza fine" (Gino Paoli, Alec Wilder) – 3:17
 "Kiss Me Honey Kiss Me" (Michael Julien, Al Timothy) – 2:35
 "Déshabillez-moi" (Robert Nyel, Gaby Verlor) – 4:18

Digital edition 
 "C'est Magnifique" (Cole Porter) – 2:27
 "Whatever Lola Wants" (Richard Adler, Jerry Ross) – 3:07
 "Is That All There Is?" (Jerry Leiber, Mike Stoller) – 4:24
 "Love for Sale" (Cole Porter) – 3:35
 "I'm in the Mood for Love" (Dorothy Fields, Jimmy McHugh) – 3:48
 "My Baby Just Cares for Me" (Walter Donaldson, Gus Kahn) – 3:36
 "Si la photo est bonne" (Barbara) – 2:52
 "Johnny" (Friedrich Hollaender) – 3:03
 "Bambino" (Giuseppe Fanciulli, Nisa) – 3:19
 "Senza fine" (Gino Paoli, Alec Wilder) – 3:15
 "Kiss Me Honey Kiss Me" (Michael Julien, Al Timothy) – 2:34
 "Déshabillez-moi" (Robert Nyel, Gaby Verlor) – 4:18
 "Johnny" (Live) (Friedrich Hollaender) – 2:51
 "Queen of Chinatown" (Version 2006) (Rainer Pietsch, Amanda Lear) – 4:11
 "Tomorrow" (Version 2006) (Rainer Pietsch, Amanda Lear) – 3:33

Personnel 
Amanda Lear – lead vocals, concept and titles selection
Jun Adashi – production assistant
Alain Bernard – keyboards, co-arranger on "Love for Sale"
Pierre Bertrand – piano
Lionel Campana – concert master
Yvon Chateigner – record producer
Christophe at Claude Maxime, Paris – Amanda Lear's hairstyle
Julien Daguet – photography
Christophe Galizio – drums, percussion
Romain Joubert – pro-tools assistant
Vincent Lépée – sound engineer
Vincent Malléa – design
Yves Martin – backing vocals
Alain Mendiburu – record producer
Leonard Raponi – musical arranger, keyboards, programming, backing vocals
Aurélien Tourette – design

Release history

References

External links 
 With Love at Discogs
 With Love at Rate Your Music

2006 albums
Amanda Lear albums
Covers albums
Jazz albums by French artists